Aastha is a spiritual TV network in India. Established in 2000, it is owned by Aastha Broadcasting Network Ltd. The network's directors are Santosh Kumar Jain and Prabhat Kumar Jain.

In 2005, the channel started the broadcast of Aastha International through UK affiliate as it had done previously in the United States as a 24x7 service on the DTH platform of BSkyB in UK. By 2006 it was reaching 160 countries around the world.

Its programs feature spiritual discourses, socio-cultural ceremonies and religious events, accompanied by meditation techniques and devotional music. They include information about places of pilgrimage, festivals, and vedic science, such as Yoga, Ayurveda, astrology.

Notable hosts and speakers 
Notable former and current hosts and speakers include:
 Rakesh Jhaveri
 Deepakbhai Desai
 Sukhabodhananda
 Sister Shivani
 Rajiv Dixit
 Avdhoot Shivanand

References

External links
 

Religious television channels in India
Hindi-language television channels in India
Television channels and stations established in 2000
Indian direct broadcast satellite services